Võ Văn Tần (21 August 1894 – 28 August 1941) was a Vietnamese revolutionary.

He was executed by French firing squad at the Giồng T-road junction (ngã ba Giồng) in Hóc Môn District along with Nguyễn Thị Minh Khai and Nguyễn Văn Cừ in August 1941.

References

Vietnamese nationalists
Vietnamese revolutionaries
1894 births
1941 deaths
Members of the 1st Central Committee of the Indochinese Communist Party